Valentin Iglinsky (born 12 May 1984 in Astana) is a Kazakh road racing cyclist who last rode for UCI ProTour team .  He is the younger brother of Maxim Iglinsky, who rode for the  team.

Career

Iglinsky returned to the  team in 2014. On 10 September 2014, it was announced that Iglinsky had tested positive for EPO at the Eneco Tour. He was immediately fired by the  management, who said Iglinsky acted independently of the team.

Career achievements

Major results

2006
1st Stage 6 Tour of Hainan
2007
2nd GP Stad Vilvoorde
2nd Overall Tour of Japan
1st Stages 2 & 4
3rd Road race, National Road Championships
Tour de Bulgaria
1st Stages 1 & 2
2008
1st Stage 2 Tour du Loir-et-Cher
Vuelta a Navarra
1st Stages 3 & 6
2009
1st Overall Tour de Kumano
1st Stages 1, 2 & 3
7th Overall Tour of Serbia
1st Stages 1, 3 & 7
Tour of Qinghai Lake
1st Stages 4 & 5
Tour de Bulgaria
1st Stages 4 & 5
3rd  Road race, Asian Road Championships
4th Overall Tour of Japan
2010
1st Overall Tour of Hainan
1st Stage 2
2011
1st Overall Tour of Hainan
1st Stage 8
1st Stage 2 Tour of Turkey
2012
2nd Overall Tour of Hainan
2013
4th Road race, National Road Championships

Grand Tour general classification results timeline

References

External links 
 

Palmares on Cycling Base (French)

Kazakhstani male cyclists
1984 births
Living people
Presidential Cycling Tour of Turkey stage winners
Cyclists at the 2010 Asian Games
Sportspeople from Astana
Doping cases in cycling
Kazakhstani sportspeople in doping cases
Asian Games competitors for Kazakhstan
21st-century Kazakhstani people